Dharyi is a sub-district located in Shaharah District, 'Amran Governorate, Yemen. Dharyi had a population of 17262 according to the 2004 census.

References 

Sub-districts in Shaharah District